Inquisitor eburatus is a species of sea snail, a marine gastropod mollusk in the family Pseudomelatomidae.

Description
The length of the shell varies between 58 mm and 70 mm.

Distribution
This marine species occurs off Madagascar.

References

 Bozzetti L. (2011) Inquisitor eburatus (Gastropoda: Hypsogastropoda: Pseudomelatomidae) nuova specie dal Madagascar Occidentale. Malacologia Mostra Mondiale 73: 3-4

External links
 Gastropods.com: Inquisitor eburatus

eburatus
Gastropods described in 2011